Johannes Degener (September 14, 1889 – February 13, 1959) was a German politician of the Christian Democratic Union (CDU) and former member of the German Bundestag.

Life 
In 1946, he became a member of the CDU and was the state manager from 1946 to 1947, and from 1946 to 1 October 1949, he was a member of the Bremische Bürgerschaft, where he had been chairman of the CDU parliamentary group since 1947.

He was a member of the German Bundestag from the first election in 1949 until 31 December 1951.

Literature

References

1889 births
1959 deaths
Members of the Bundestag for Bremen
Members of the Bundestag 1949–1953
Members of the Bundestag for the Christian Democratic Union of Germany
Members of the Bürgerschaft of Bremen